Punta Borinquen Radar Station is a facility of the Puerto Rico Air National Guard home for the 141st Air Control Squadron. Located adjacent to Rafael Hernández Airport (which operates at the old Ramey Air Force Base), in Aguadilla, Puerto Rico. The facility has operated since 1964 when the 140th Aircraft Control and Warning Squadron (ACWS) was created under the control of Air Defense Command (ADC).

See also
Air National Guard
Puerto Rico National Guard
Military of Puerto Rico

References

}

Buildings and structures in Aguadilla, Puerto Rico
Installations of the United States Air National Guard
Military facilities in Puerto Rico
Radar stations of the United States Air Force
1964 establishments in Puerto Rico
Military installations established in 1964